A Storyteller in Zion (1993) is a collection of short stories and articles by Orson Scott Card.  Card is a member of the Church of Jesus Christ of Latter-day Saints (LDS).  Unlike much of his work, which is often science fiction, fantasy or similar fiction genres, A Storyteller in Zion is a collection of works which are of LDS themes.

For a number of years, Card worked as an editor for the official LDS magazine The Ensign and while in that position penned a number of articles for the periodical (and he also wrote some for the Church's young adult magazine, The New Era).  The stories are a mixture of fiction and non-fiction.

"Zion" in the title refers to the Church's use of the word to refer to the Lord's people or to the Church itself.

See also

List of works by Orson Scott Card

External links
Page on the book from Card's website

1993 books
Books by Orson Scott Card
LDS non-fiction